Eublemma purpurina, the beautiful marbled, is a moth of the family Erebidae. The species was first described by Michael Denis and Ignaz Schiffermüller in 1775. It is found from North Africa through the Iberian Peninsula and southern France east to Romania, southern Russia, southern Turkey up to western central Asia. In the north it ranges to Valais, in eastern Austria and Hungary and the Czech Republic.

Adults are on wing from May to June and from August to September in two generations.

The larvae feed on creeping thistle (Cirsium arvense).

References

External links
Lepiforum e.V.

Boletobiinae
Moths described in 1775
Moths of Africa
Moths of Asia
Moths of Europe
Taxa named by Michael Denis
Taxa named by Ignaz Schiffermüller